Inglewood High School may refer to the following schools:
 Inglewood High School (California)
 Inglewood High School, New Zealand